Nalanda College of Arts and Science is a self-financing college located in Kasaragod district, Kerala. It is recognized by the government of Kerala and affiliated to Kannur University.

References

External links

Arts and Science colleges in Kerala
Colleges affiliated to Kannur University
Colleges in Kasaragod district